The Swedish Lion or The lion monument are two statues erected as monuments of the battle of Narva in 1700 in the city of Narva in Estonia.

The first version, a copy of one of the lions at the Stockholm Palace, was erected by an entrance to the city in 1936 but was destroyed during World War II. A new version, a copy of the Medici lion of the Royal Swedish Academy of Fine Arts, was erected by the Narva river in 2000.

The first statue 1936–1944 

The first statue was a copy of the eastern lion statue at Stockholm Palace and was cast by Meyers konstgjuteri in Stockholm. The monument was designed by professor Ragnar Östberg. The statue was inaugurated October 18, 1936 by prince Gustaf Adolf at the site of the battle of Narva, west of the city.

The monument was financed by the Narva committee which had been created for this purpose. The committee was chaired by count  Folke Bernadotte.

The monument was hit by Soviet artillery in early summer 1944 during the battle of Narva. The valuable metal scraps were reused during the end of German occupation of Estonia by German defence industry. The only remnant of the monument is a rubble pile by E20 at the western entrance to Narva.

A new monument was inaugurated by vice prime minister Lena Hjelm-Wallén on November 19, 2000 in connection with the 300 year anniversary of the battle of Narva. The new monument was erected as a memorial for all of those who died at the battle as well as the battle itself, and also as symbol of present-day cooperation between Estonia and Sweden.

The new monument is located at Hermann Castle by the Narva river and is a bronze replica of the Royal Swedish Academy's lion, which itself is an early copy of one of the  Medici lions. It is also the same lion that Bernhard Foucquet used as a starting point for the lions of Stockholm Palace. The monument is placed on a granite pedestal similar to the one designed by Ragnar Östberg for the first statue. The pedestal is inscribed with the Latin text SVECIA MEMOR ("Sweden remembers") and MDCC (1700, the year of the battle of Narva).

The project was carried out by the Swedish Institute and financed by Swedish businesses in Estonia. The driving forces behind the new Narva monument were historian Eldar Efendijev, the mayor of Narva at the time, and Hans Lepp, the cultural head of the Swedish Institute and former cultural attaché in the Baltic countries.

References

Sources 
 Westberg, Lennart. ”Narva-lejonet: ett karolinermonuments öde i Estland”. Karolinska förbundets årsbok (Stockholm: Karolinska förbundet) 1991:  sid. 122–137. ISSN 0348-9833.  Libris 2358252

External links

Lions in culture
Estonia–Sweden relations
Military history of Estonia
Sculptures of lions
Bronze sculptures
Narva
Monuments and memorials in Estonia